The 2012 Charleston Southern Buccaneers football team represented Charleston Southern University as a member of the Big South Conference during the 2012 NCAA Division I FCS football season. Led by Jay Mills in his tenth and final season as head coach, the Buccaneers compiled an overall record of 5–6 with a mark of 3–3 in conference play, placing fourth in the Big South. Charleston Southern played home games at Buccaneer Field in Charleston, South Carolina.

Schedule

References

Charleston Southern
Charleston Southern Buccaneers football seasons
Charleston Southern Buccaneers football